Hasenbach is a small river in the Swabian Alb, Baden-Württemberg, Germany. Its source is a karst spring. It flows into the Zwiefalter Aach close to where this river emerges from the water cave Wimsener Höhle.

See also
List of rivers of Baden-Württemberg

Rivers of Baden-Württemberg
Waterfalls of Germany
Rivers of Germany